Masliwa  is a Sahara desert town in the Al Wahat District in the Cyrenaica region of northeastern Libya.

References

External links
Satellite map at Maplandia.com

Populated places in Al Wahat District
Cyrenaica